Epacris pulchella, commonly known as wallum heath or coral heath is a species of flowering plant in the family Ericaceae and is endemic to eastern Australia. It is a slender, erect shrub with egg-shaped, pointed leaves and white or pinkish, tube-shaped flowers.

Description
The anthers protrude beyond the end of the petal tube. This species is similar to E. microphylla but has longer leaves and flowers.

Taxonomy and naming
Epacris pulchella was first formally described by Antonio José Cavanilles in 1797 and the description was published in his book Icones et descriptiones plantarum. The specific epithet (pulchella) means "beautiful and small".

Distribution and habitat
Wallum heath grows in heath, woodland and forest on ridgetops and hillsides on the coast and nearby tablelands from south-east Queensland to near Conjola in south-eastern New South Wales.

References

pulchella
Ericales of Australia
Flora of New South Wales
Flora of Queensland
Plants described in 1797
Taxa named by Antonio José Cavanilles